Valery Dmitrievitch Bolotov (13 February 1970 – 27 January 2017) was a Ukrainian leader known for his involvement in the Donbas War in eastern Ukraine, and as the leader of the self-proclaimed Luhansk People's Republic.

Biography 
Little is known about Bolotov's life prior to 2014; in a video of him voting in a local referendum, he presents a Ukrainian passport which indicates that he was born in Taganrog, Rostov Oblast on 13 February 1970. In 1974, he moved to Stakhanov, in the Luhansk Oblast, eastern Ukraine.

Bolotov claimed to be a senior sergeant of the Soviet Airborne Troops in Vitebsk (presumably the 103rd Guards Airborne Division), and between 1989 and 1990 participated in a number of conflicts, including those in Tbilisi, Yerevan and Karabakh. He later became the head of the airborne veterans group, while no one of the Luhansk Oblast group cell can confirm it.

Bolotov worked as a manager and director at a meat factory and used to run a small business.

Before the pro-Russian unrest in Ukraine, Bolotov was a representative of Oleksandr Yefremov who supervised illegal mining in the region.

In 2014, Bolotov became a leader of an armed group during the 2014 pro-Russian conflict in Ukraine. On May 13, 2014, Bolotov survived an assassination attempt as assailants fired automatic weapons towards his car, wounding the militant leader. Bolotov was then briefly captured by the Ukrainian army on May 17 after he attempted to re-enter Luhansk following his having received treatment for his injury at a hospital in Russia. However, armed supporters of the Luhansk People's Republic attacked the Ukrainian army checkpoint where Bolotov was being held shortly afterwards and successfully freed the "People's Governor". He resigned from the position on 14 August 2014.

Death 
Bolotov was found dead on 27 January 2017 in his own home in Moscow, Russia. Investigators tried to determine the cause of his death as the preliminary results of clinical tests showed an acute heart failure as the cause of his death.  His wife later claimed that he may have been poisoned. Though more detailed report of the local police office claimed that there were no obvious signs of the acute heart failure and only small atherosclerotic plaques were identified instead, it was known that before death he was complaining to his wife about his health deterioration, which happened right after drinking a cup of coffee at the business meeting in company with two men he allegedly knew, it became later known that Bolotov met with ex-speaker of the People's council of the LNR Alexey Karyakin and Valery Alexandrovich as he had said and added also that the meeting was appointed by request of Bolotov himself. Bolotov's corpse was later tested for the presence of the poisoning drugs in his body at the request of his wife, but as of 2018, the results are unknown.

His widow has two children.

See also 

 Alexander Bednov
 Aleksandr Kharitonov (politician)
 Aleksey Mozgovoy
 Arsen Pavlov
 Mikhail Tolstykh
 Gennadiy Tsypkalov
 Alexander Zakharchenko
 List of unsolved deaths
 Separatist forces of the war in Donbass

References

External links

1970 births
2017 deaths
Military personnel of the Nagorno-Karabakh War
Politicians from Taganrog
People of Anti-Maidan
People of the Luhansk People's Republic
Pro-Russian people of the 2014 pro-Russian unrest in Ukraine
Pro-Russian people of the war in Donbas
Russian expatriates in Ukraine
Russian nationalists
Unsolved deaths
Warlords
Ukrainian collaborators with Russia
Heads of the Luhansk People's Republic